Samih may refer to:

Hassan Samih Chaito (born 1991), Lebanese footballer
Samih Darwazah (1930–2015), the founder of Hikma Pharmaceuticals, Jordanian Minister of Energy and Mineral Resources
Samih Farsoun, (1937–2005), professor emeritus of sociology at American University
Samih Al Ghabbas, Egyptian physician and writer
Samih Abdel Fattah Iskandar, International Commissioner of the Jordanian Association for Boy Scouts and Girl Guides
Samih Madhoun, senior leader of the Al-Aqsa Martyrs Brigade, an armed group affiliated with the Palestinian political party Fatah
Basel Samih (born 1981), Qatari footballer who is a goalkeeper
Naima Samih (born 1953), Moroccan artist
Samih al-Maaytah, the Minister of Information of Jordan
Samih al-Qasim (1939–2014), Palestinian Druze poet with Israeli citizenship
Samih Sawiris (born 1957), Egyptian-Montenegrin businessman and billionaire
Samih Yalnızgil (1875–1932), Turkish linguist and politician

See also
Saami (disambiguation)
Sami (disambiguation)
Sammi (disambiguation)
Sámi
Sämi